Scantling Length is a distance slightly less than the waterline length of a ship, and generally less than the overall length of a ship.  

In the ABS Rules for Building and Classing Steel Vessels, it is defined as the distance on the summer load line from the fore side of the stem to the centerline of the rudder stock.  Scantling length need not be less than 96%, nor more than 97% of the length of the summer load line. 

Most other classification societies use a similar definition of scantling length to define the general length of a ship.  The scantling length is used by classification societies for all calculations where the waterline length, overall length, displacement length, etc. is called for.  Naval architects wishing to comply with class rules would also use the scantling length.

References 
 ABS Rules for Building and Classing Steel Vessels, Part 3, Hull Construction and Equipment, Rule 3.1.1/3.1, 2007.

Naval architecture